The Yonne is a river in France, a left-bank tributary of the Seine. The river gives its name to the Yonne département. It rises in the Nièvre département, in the Morvan hills near Château-Chinon. It flows into the river Seine at Montereau-Fault-Yonne.

The Yonne flows through the following départements and towns: 
Nièvre: Château-Chinon, Clamecy
Yonne: Auxerre, Migennes, Joigny, Villeneuve-sur-Yonne, Sens
Seine-et-Marne: Montereau-Fault-Yonne

The main tributaries of the Yonne are the Vanne, the Armançon, the Serein and the Cure.

History 
The river was historically used for flottage, or the floating of rafts of timber from the Morvan forest to serve the needs of the capital, Paris. It was bypassed as a rafting waterway by the Canal du Nivernais in 1841, from near its source at Corbigny down to Auxerre.

In 1834 the engineer Charles Poirée had successfully tested his design for a needle weir, and this construction technique was adopted on the river Yonne. The first lock was built in the 1840s, the others from 1861. The locks were enlarged to Freycinet standards in the late 19th century, then again to their current dimensions after World War II.

Navigation 
At Laroche-Migennes (PK 23), the Yonne connects with the Canal de Bourgogne. There are 9 locks on the river on the first section to Laroche-Migennes, the remaining 17 on the more gently-sloping lower course of the river.

See also

 Rivers of France
 List of canals in France

References

External links 
 River Yonne maps and information on places, ports and moorings on the river, by the author of Inland Waterways of France, 8th ed., 2010, Imray
 Navigation details for 80 French rivers and canals (French waterways website section)

Rivers of France
Rivers of Nièvre
Rivers of Seine-et-Marne
Rivers of Yonne
Rivers of Bourgogne-Franche-Comté
Rivers of Île-de-France